On 30 September 2010, U.S. helicopters entered Pakistani airspace after ground troops determined that a mortar attack by militants in Pakistan was imminent, according to the Coalition. Pakistani Frontier Corps troops manning the Mandata Kadaho border post fired warning shots, and the helicopters responded by firing two missiles that destroyed the post. Three soldiers were killed and another three wounded. Pakistan responded by closing a key NATO supply route for eleven days.

References

International incidents